Ahmed Harrane (born 8 June 1985) is a Tunisian football midfielder who currently plays for FC Hammamet.

References

1985 births
Living people
Tunisian footballers
Tunisia international footballers
CS Hammam-Lif players
CA Bizertin players
Al-Nasr SC (Kuwait) players
EGS Gafsa players
FC Hammamet players
Association football midfielders
Tunisian Ligue Professionnelle 1 players
Tunisian expatriate footballers
Expatriate footballers in Kuwait
Tunisian expatriate sportspeople in Kuwait
Footballers from Tunis
Kuwait Premier League players